The ProA is the second-tier league of professional club basketball in Germany. The league comprises 16 teams. Officially the ProA is part of the 2. Basketball Bundesliga, which consists of the two hierarchical leagues ProA and ProB. Before the 2007–08 season, the 2. Basketball Bundesliga was a basketball league with the same name, which consisted of two geographical divisions. At the end of the league stage, the top two teams qualify for the Basketball Bundesliga, and the teams positioned 15th and 16th are relegated to the lower league, ProB.

Current teams (2022–23)

Champions
The champions of a given ProA season promote to the Basketball Bundesliga, along with the runner-up of the Finals.

Performances by club

Awards

Coach of the Year

References 

 
2. Basketball Bundesliga
Basketball leagues in Germany
Germany
Professional sports leagues in Germany